The Caudron C.580 was a French advanced trainer aircraft intended to prepare pilots for the new low wing monoplane fighters of the mid-1930s.  It did not go into production and only two were built.

Design

The C.580 was designed to train fighter pilots in a single-seat, low wing monoplane, the standard layout of new fighter aircraft in the mid-1930s, It was low-powered but fast, capable of aerobatics and fitted with a camera in place of a gun. Caudron had already designed several aircraft with this layout; the two closest to the C.580 were the C.430 and C.530 Raphales, though these were two-seat machines.

Its cantilever, two piece, wooden wing was straight tapered in plan to semi-elliptical tips. Each wing was built around a single, spruce box spar and covered with birch plywood. There were short ailerons near the tips and inboard split flaps.

The Caudron C.580 was powered by  Renault 4Pei, an air-cooled, four cylinder, inverted in-line engine which produced  for take-off. The fuselage was built around four ash longerons, joined horizontally by N-form, spruce trellises and with birch ply sides with spruce stiffeners. The upper fuselage surface was curved and the forward fuselage from the engine firewall to the cabin was partly occupied by the fuel tank. Its large, fully glazed cockpit was mostly aft of  the trailing edge of the wing and was smoothly faired into the rear fuselage with a magnesium upper surface.

The tail unit of the C.580 was conventional, with a tapered tailplane mounted at mid-fuselage height carrying inset elevators. The fin was also straight tapered and the rudder inset. All the control surfaces were ply covered and unbalanced, so the tailplane's angle of incidence could be adjusted in flight and was interconnected to the flaps.

Its balloon-tyred mainwheels, under large fairings, were attached by short vertical oleo struts to the wing spars. The tailskid had a case-hardened steel shoe on a rubber block fixed to a pair of welded steel shells.

Development

The Caudron C.580 first flew on 22 December 1934 having been registered as F-ANAS two days before. In the week beginning 18 March 1935 it went to the Centre d'Essais de Matériels Aériens at Villacoublay for its official tests, which continued until July that year. It proved to be unstable at high angles-of-attack and had poor spinning characteristics, and was therefore not recommended for military use. A second C.580 was built (F-ANAT), flying in March 1935, but was destroyed when it hit a hangar during a take-off accident in May that year. The first prototype was slightly modified during 1935 and redesignated the C.581. It continued to be used for aerobatic flying by Caudron test pilots into 1939. The civil register notes a change in ownership of the first prototype in March 1939.

Specifications

References

Bibliography

1930s French military trainer aircraft
C.580
Low-wing aircraft
Single-engined tractor aircraft
Aircraft first flown in 1934